Sawan Aya Re (The Monsoon Has Come) is a 1949 Hindi romantic drama film, directed by Kishore Sahu. Produced by Sahu under his "Hindustan Chitra" banner, it had Khemchand Prakash as the music director. The cast included Kishore Sahu, Ramola Devi, David, Pratima Devi, Ramesh Gupta, Sofia and Mohana.

The film was a romantic triangle set against the backdrop of a hill station, Nainital. A family arrives on a holiday, but the father is more keen on finding bridegrooms for his three daughters.

Plot
Anand (Kishore Sahu) lives in Nainital with his mother (Pratima Devi). They meet the Mathur family who have recently arrived there for holidays. The father wants to get his three daughters Asha, Sudha and Rama  married and is hoping to find some suitable boys for them. When Asha and Anand meet they form a friendship, which is readily accepted by the two families who decide to get them married. However, Asha finds out that Anand and Sudha are in love with each other.

Cast
 Kishore Sahu as Anand
 Ramola as Asha
 David as Ranvir Khanna
 Mohana
 Ramesh Gupta
 Sofia
 Gulab
 Pratima Devi as Anand's mother
 Anant Prabhu
 Promoth Bose

Box-office And Reception
The film did well commercially, with Baburao Patel of Filmindia remarking in the 1949 May edition that Sahu's estimate had risen due to the "original treatment" he gave to an "otherwise ordinary" story.

Soundtrack
The music director was Khemchand Prakash. The notable songs were "Ae Dil Na Mujhe Yad Dila" sung by Khan Mastana, "Mein Toh Gawan Chali" by Shamshad Begum, and "Nahin Faryaad karte Hum" also sung by Shamshad Begum. The four lyricists were Gulshan Jalalabadi, Arzoo Lakhnavi, Rammurti Chaturvedi and Bharat Vyas. The playback singers were Shamshad Begum, Amirbai Karnataki, Laita Devulkar, Mohammed Rafi and Khan Mastana.

Song List

References

External links

1949 films
1940s Hindi-language films
Films directed by Kishore Sahu
Films scored by Khemchand Prakash
Indian black-and-white films
Indian romantic drama films
1949 romantic drama films